The Alaska Volcano Observatory (AVO) is a joint program of the United States Geological Survey (USGS), the Geophysical Institute of the University of Alaska Fairbanks (UAFGI), and the State of Alaska Division of Geological and Geophysical Surveys (ADGGS). AVO was formed in 1988, and uses federal, state, and university resources to monitor and study Alaska's volcanology, hazardous volcanoes, to predict and record eruptive activity, and to mitigate volcanic hazards to life and property. The Observatory website allows users to monitor active volcanoes, with seismographs and webcameras that update regularly. AVO now monitors more than 20 volcanoes in Cook Inlet, which is close to Alaskan population centers, and the Aleutian Arc due to the hazard that plumes of ash pose to aviation.

AVO operates out of two locations. One is at the U.S. Geological Survey office on the campus of Alaska Pacific University in Anchorage. Other AVO offices are at the Geophysical Institute of the University of Alaska in Fairbanks.

Monitored volcanoes

The following list shows volcanoes regularly monitored by the Alaska Volcano Observatory using activity detection instruments. While the majority of these volcanoes are in remote locations and would only pose a threat to aviation, there are a few in some areas that could have an impact on populated communities.
Akutan Peak on Akutan Island in the Fox Islands group
Aniakchak Crater in Aniakchak National Monument and Preserve on the Alaska Peninsula (includes Aniakchak Peak and Vent Mountain)
Atka Volcanic Complex on Atka Island in the Andreanof Islands group (includes Kliuchef, Konia, Korovin and Sarichef volcanoes)
Augustine Volcano on Augustine Island in the Cook Inlet
Fisher Caldera on Unimak Island in the Fox Islands group
Great Sitkin Volcano on Great Sitkin Island in the Andreanof Islands group
Iliamna Volcano in the Chigmit Mountains within Lake Clark National Park and Preserve
Isanotski Peaks on Unimak Island in the Fox Islands group
Kanaga Volcano on Kanaga Island in the Andreanof Islands group
Little Sitkin Volcano on Little Sitkin Island in the Rat Islands group
Makushin Volcano on Unalaska Island in the Fox Islands group
Mount Dutton on the Alaska Peninsula near Cold Bay
Mount Gareloi on Gareloi Island in the Andreanof Islands group
Mount Griggs in the Aleutian Range within Katmai National Park and Preserve
Mount Katmai in the Aleutian Range within Katmai National Park and Preserve
Mount Mageik in the Aleutian Range within Katmai National Park and Preserve
Mount Martin in the Aleutian Range within Katmai National Park and Preserve
Mount Peulik on the Alaska Peninsula near Becharof Lake
Mount Spurr in the Alaska Range near Anchorage (includes Crater Peak)
Mount Veniaminof on the Alaska Peninsula near Perryville
Mount Wrangell in the Wrangell Mountains of southeastern Alaska
Novarupta in the Aleutian Range within Katmai National Park and Preserve
Okmok Caldera on Umnak Island in the Fox Islands group (includes Mount Okmok, Jag Peak and Tulik Volcano)
Pavlof Volcano on the Alaska Peninsula near Cold Bay
Redoubt Volcano in the Chigmit Mountains within Lake Clark National Park and Preserve
Semisopochnoi Volcano on Semisopochnoi Island in the Rat Islands group (includes Anvil Peak and Mount Young)
Shishaldin Volcano on Unimak Island in the Fox Islands group
Snowy Mountain in the Aleutian Range within Katmai National Park and Preserve
Takawangha Volcano on Tanaga Island in the Andreanof Islands group
Tanaga Volcano on Tanaga Island in the Andreanof Islands group
Trident Volcano in the Aleutian Range within Katmai National Park and Preserve
Ugashik Caldera on the Alaska Peninsula near Becharof Lake
Ukinrek Maars on the Alaska Peninsula near Becharof Lake
Westdahl Volcano on Unimak Island in the Fox Islands group (includes Faris and Westdahl peaks)

The following list shows select volcanoes monitored by AVO but currently do not have activity detection instruments and generally rely on satellite and local observations. These primarily include volcanoes that have had eruptions or other volcanic activity in recent years. Such monitoring is not limited to the volcanoes listed below and more could be added in the future if necessary.

Bogoslof Volcano on Bogoslof Island in the Fox Islands group
Davidof Volcano on Davidof Island in the Rat Islands group
Fourpeaked Mountain in the Aleutian Range within Katmai National Park and Preserve
Kasatochi Volcano on Kasatochi Island in the Andreanof Islands group
Kiska Volcano on Kiska Island in the Rat Islands group
Mount Chiginagak on the Alaska Peninsula near Ugashik
Mount Cleveland on Chuginadak Island in the Islands of Four Mountains group
Mount Douglas in the Aleutian Range within Katmai National Park and Preserve
Mount Edgecumbe on Kruzof Island near Sitka
Seguam Volcano on Seguam Island in the Andreanof Islands group (includes Pyre Peak)

See also
 Geophysical Institute
 Kamchatka Volcanic Eruption Response Team
 United States Geological Survey

References

External links
 
 AVO Monitoring Network

1988 establishments in Alaska
Earth sciences
Government agencies established in 1988
United States Geological Survey
Science and technology in Alaska
Volcano
University of Alaska Fairbanks
Alaska Pacific University
Volcano observatories